Yurivka is an urban-type settlement in Alchevsk Raion of Luhansk Oblast in eastern Ukraine. Population:

Demographics
Native language distribution as of the Ukrainian Census of 2001:
 Ukrainian: 38.99%
 Russian: 60.76%
 Others: 0.14%

References

Urban-type settlements in Alchevsk Raion